The following outline is provided as an overview of and topical guide to the United Kingdom of Great Britain and Northern Ireland; a sovereign country in Europe, commonly known as the United Kingdom (UK), or Britain. Lying off the north-western coast of the European mainland, it includes the island of Great Britain—a term also applied loosely to refer to the whole country—the north-eastern part of the island of Ireland and many smaller islands.

General reference

 The United Kingdom is...
 both a country and a country made up of countries
 both a nation state and a state made up of nations
 an island country
 a Commonwealth realm (1931–)
 Pronunciation: 
 Abbreviations: UK
 Common English country names: The United Kingdom, The UK, or Britain
 Official English country name: The United Kingdom of Great Britain and Northern Ireland
 Common endonyms: United Kingdom, UK, Britain
 Official endonyms: United Kingdom of Great Britain and Northern Ireland
 Adjectivals: British, United Kingdom
 Demonyms: Briton, British, Brit
 Etymology: Name of Britain, Name of the United Kingdom
 Name of England
 Name of Northern Ireland
 Name of Scotland
 Name of Wales
 International rankings of the United Kingdom
 Terminology of the British Isles
 United Kingdom-related topics
 England-related topics
 Scotland-related topics
 Wales-related topics
 Northern Ireland-related topics
 ISO country codes: GB, GBR, 826
 ISO region codes: See ISO 3166-2:GB
 Internet country code top-level domain: .uk, .gb (not used)

Countries of the United Kingdom, Dependencies, Territories and Commonwealth

Countries of the UK and their subdivisions

 England
 Subdivisions of England
 Regions of England
 Counties of England (see also Metropolitan county and Shire county)
 Unitary authorities of England
 Districts of England (see also Metropolitan district and Shire district)
 Civil parishes
 Greater London
 London boroughs
 West Midlands
 Northern Ireland
 Counties of Northern Ireland
 Local government in Northern Ireland
 Districts of Northern Ireland
 Scotland
 Subdivisions of Scotland
 Wales
 Subdivisions of Wales

Crown Dependencies

Crown Dependencies
 Isle of Man
 Channel Islands
 Jersey
 Guernsey
 Alderney
 Sark

British Overseas Territories

British Overseas Territories
 Anguilla
 Bermuda
 British Antarctic Territory
 British Indian Ocean Territory
 British Virgin Islands
 Cayman Islands
 Falkland Islands
 Gibraltar
 Montserrat
 Pitcairn Islands
 Saint Helena, Ascension and Tristan da Cunha
 South Georgia and the South Sandwich Islands
 Sovereign Base Areas of Akrotiri and Dhekelia in Cyprus
 Turks and Caicos Islands

Commonwealth of Nations

The United Kingdom is a member state of the Commonwealth of Nations
 Member states of the Commonwealth of Nations
 Commonwealth realm
 Commonwealth citizen
 Head of the Commonwealth
 Commonwealth War Graves Commission (1917-)
 Commonwealth Games (1930-)

Geography, resources and demography

Geography of the United Kingdom

 Location:
 Northern Hemisphere, on the Prime meridian
 Atlantic Ocean
 Eurasia (but not on the mainland)
 Europe
 Northern Europe and Western Europe
 British Isles
 Great Britain (entire island and adjacent isles)
 Ireland (northeastern sixth of the island)
 Time zone: Greenwich Mean Time = Western European Time (UTC+00), British Summer Time = Western European Summer Time (UTC+01)
 Area of the United Kingdom:  – 79th most extensive country
 Area of the countries of the United Kingdom
 Extreme points of the United Kingdom:
 North: Out Stack, Shetland Islands 
 South: Western Rocks, Isles of Scilly 
 East: Lowestoft Ness, Suffolk 
 West: Rockall1 
 High: Ben Nevis, Lochaber at  
 Low: The Fens at  
 Land boundaries:  360 km
 Land boundary:   undersea in Channel Tunnel
 Coastline: 12,429 km
 Atlas of the United Kingdom
 Atlas of England
 Atlas of Northern Ireland
 Atlas of Scotland
 Atlas of Wales
 Economic geography of the United Kingdom

Ecoregions

List of ecoregions in the United Kingdom

Environment
 Climate of the United Kingdom
 Environmental issues in the United Kingdom
 Conservation in the United Kingdom
 Energy in the United Kingdom
 Green building in the United Kingdom
 Ecoregions in the United Kingdom
 Renewable energy in the United Kingdom
 Green electricity in the United Kingdom
 Hydroelectricity in the United Kingdom
 Wind power in the United Kingdom
 Solar power in the United Kingdom
 Geology of the United Kingdom
 Earthquakes in the British Isles
 National parks of the United Kingdom
 National parks of England
 National parks of Wales
 National parks of Northern Ireland
 National parks of Scotland
 Protected areas of the United Kingdom
 Environmentally sensitive area (ESA)
 Heritage coast
 Scenic areas
 Area of Outstanding Natural Beauty (AONB) – England, Wales, Northern Ireland
 Areas of Outstanding Natural Beauty in Wales – Wales
 National scenic area – Scotland
 Scheduled monument
 Site of Special Scientific Interest (SSSI)
 Special Area of Conservation (SAC) (European Union)
 Special Protection Area (SPA) (European Union)
 Wetlands designated under the Ramsar Convention (International)
 Wildlife of the United Kingdom
 Flora of the United Kingdom
 Trees of Britain and Ireland
 List of the vascular plants of Britain and Ireland
 Fauna of the United Kingdom
 List of mammals of the United Kingdom
 Birds of the United Kingdom
 List of birds of Great Britain
 List of birds of Wales
 List of reptiles of Great Britain
 List of amphibians of Great Britain
 List of fish of Great Britain
 Lists of insects of Great Britain
 Climate of the United Kingdom
 United Kingdom Climate Change Programme
 List of UK extreme rainfall amounts
 Conservation in the United Kingdom
 Environmentally sensitive area
 Green belts
 Notable trees in Great Britain
 National nature reserve
 National Trust for Places of Historic Interest or Natural Beauty
 Special Protection Area
 Site of Special Scientific Interest
 List of waterfalls of the United Kingdom
 List of natural disasters in the British Isles
 The Great Storm of 1987

Geographic features
 Coastline
 Islands
 Lakes
 Lochs
 Mountains and hills
 Volcanoes
 Rivers
 Waterfalls
 World Heritage Sites

Regions

 Time zone of the UK

Municipalities
 Cities
 Capital of the United Kingdom: London
 Second city of the United Kingdom
 Cities by population
 Towns:
 Towns in England
 Burghs in Scotland
 Towns in Wales
 Towns in Northern Ireland
 City status in the United Kingdom
 Conurbations
 Green belt

Natural Resources

 Energy in the United Kingdom inc. Renewable energy in the United Kingdom
 Biodiesel in the United Kingdom
 Coal mining in the United Kingdom
 Geothermal power in the United Kingdom
 Hydraulic fracturing in the United Kingdom
 Hydroelectricity in the United Kingdom
 Marine energy in the United Kingdom
 North Sea oil
 Solar power in the United Kingdom
 Wind power in the United Kingdom
 Food
 Agriculture in the United Kingdom
 Fishing industry in England
 Fishing in Scotland
 Fishing industry in Wales
 Hunting and shooting in the United Kingdom
 Materials
 Forestry in the United Kingdom
 Mining in the United Kingdom
 List of renewable resources produced and traded by the United Kingdom

Demography

Demography of the United Kingdom

 Population of the United Kingdom:	64,105,700 (2013 estimate) making it the 22nd most populous country and, with a population density of 259/km2 (679/sq.mile), ranking it 51st on the List of sovereign states and dependent territories by population density.  This is largely due to the particularly high population density of England which measures 406/km2.
 Population of the countries of the United Kingdom
 UK birth and deaths since 1960
 Immigration to the United Kingdom

Ethnicity

Ethnic groups in the United Kingdom

 Commission for Racial Equality
 British
 White British
 English
 Scottish
 Welsh
 Northern Irish
 Ulster-Scot
 Cornish
 White Irish
 Other White Ethnic Groups
 Western European
 French migration to the United Kingdom
 Dutch people in the United Kingdom
 Italians in the United Kingdom
 Germans in the United Kingdom
 Spaniards in the United Kingdom
 Portuguese in the United Kingdom
 Scandinavian migration to Britain
 Eastern European
 Poles in the United Kingdom
 Baltic people in the United Kingdom
 Lithuanians in the United Kingdom
 Czechs in the United Kingdom
 Hungarians in the United Kingdom
 Greeks in the United Kingdom
 Serbs in the United Kingdom
 Romanians in the United Kingdom
 Bulgarians in the United Kingdom
 British Cypriots
 North American
 Americans in the United Kingdom
 Canadians in the United Kingdom
 Australians in the United Kingdom
 Other
 British Jews
 Irish Travellers
 Roma
 New age travellers
 British Asian
 British Indian
 British Pakistanis
 British Bangladeshi
 British Sri Lankans
 Oriental British
 British Chinese
 Filipinos in the United Kingdom
 Japanese in the United Kingdom
 Koreans in the United Kingdom
 Thais in the United Kingdom
 Malaysians in the United Kingdom
 Singaporeans in the United Kingdom
 British Arabs
 Yemenis in the United Kingdom
 British Iraqis
 Armenians in the United Kingdom
 Iranians in the United Kingdom
 British Turks
 Black British
 British African-Caribbean community
 Barbadian British
 British Jamaican
 African migration to Britain
 Ghanaians in the United Kingdom
 Kenyan migration to the United Kingdom
 British Nigerian
 South Africans in the United Kingdom
 Ugandan migration to the United Kingdom
 Tanzanians in the United Kingdom
 Zimbabweans in the United Kingdom
 Latin American migration to the United Kingdom
 Argentines in the United Kingdom
 Brazilians in the United Kingdom
 Colombians in the United Kingdom
 Ecuadorians in the United Kingdom

Government, monarchy, politics and honours

 Form of government: parliamentary multi-party representative democratic constitutional monarchy
 Censorship in the United Kingdom
 Elections in the United Kingdom
 British elections (specific elections) 
 Gun politics in the United Kingdom
 Political parties in the United Kingdom
 Political scandals of the United Kingdom
 Taxation in the United Kingdom

Monarchy

 Air transport of the Royal Family and government of the United Kingdom
 British Royal Family
 British monarchs' family tree
 Monarchy of the United Kingdom
 Coronation of the British monarch
 Household Cavalry
 Household Division
 HMY Britannia
 Line of succession to the British throne
 List of British royal residences
 List of British monarchs
 List of Royal Yachts of the United Kingdom
 List of UK place names with royal patronage
 List of organisations in the United Kingdom with a royal charter
 King's Guard and King's Life Guard
 Royal Assent
 Royal Charter
 Royal Christmas Message
 Royal Collection Management Committee
 Royal Collection Trust
 Royal Collection
 Royal Household
 Royal Librarian
 Royal Library, Windsor
 Royal Peculiar
 Royal Philatelic Collection
 Royal Prerogative
 Royal Standard
 Royal Style and Titles Act
 Royal Train
 Royal Warrant of Appointment (United Kingdom)
 Royal coat of arms of the United Kingdom
 Royal forest
 Style of the British sovereign
 Succession to the British Throne

Branches of the government

Executive branch
 Head of state: Monarch of the United Kingdom, King Charles III
 Coronation of the British monarch
 Crown Jewels of the United Kingdom
 Head of government: Prime Minister of the United Kingdom (list), Rishi Sunak
 Cabinet of the United Kingdom
 Departments of the United Kingdom Government

Legislative branch
 Parliament of the United Kingdom (bicameral)
 List of parliaments of the United Kingdom
 List of parliaments of Great Britain
 Upper house: House of Lords
 Lower house: House of Commons of the United Kingdom
 List of British MPs

Judicial branch

Courts of the United Kingdom
 Courts of England and Wales
 Courts of Northern Ireland
 Courts of Scotland
 Supreme Court of the United Kingdom

Foreign relations

Foreign relations of the United Kingdom
 History
 Timeline of British diplomatic history
 United Kingdom and the United Nations
 Special Relationship
 Diplomatic missions in the United Kingdom
 Diplomatic missions of the United Kingdom

International organisation membership
The United Kingdom of Great Britain and Northern Ireland is a member of:

 African Development Bank (AfDB) (nonregional member)
 African Union/United Nations Hybrid Operation in Darfur (UNAMID)
 Arctic Council (observer)
 Asian Development Bank (ADB) (nonregional member)
 Australia Group
 Bank for International Settlements (BIS)
 British-Irish Council (BIC)
 Caribbean Development Bank (CDB) (nonregional member)
 Commonwealth of Nations
 Confederation of European Paper Industries (CEPI)
 Council of Europe (CE)
 Council of the Baltic Sea States (CBSS)
 Euro-Atlantic Partnership Council (EAPC)
 European Bank for Reconstruction and Development (EBRD)
 European Investment Bank (EIB)
 European Organization for the Exploitation of Meteorological Satellites (EUMETSAT)
 European Organization for Nuclear Research (CERN)
 European Space Agency (ESA)
 Food and Agriculture Organization (FAO)
 General Conference on Weights and Measures (CGPM)
 Group of Five (G5)
 Group of Eight (G8)
 Group of Ten (G10)
 Group of Twenty Finance Ministers and Central Bank Governors (G20)
 Inter-American Development Bank (IADB)
 International Atomic Energy Agency (IAEA)
 International Bank for Reconstruction and Development (IBRD)
 International Chamber of Commerce (ICC)
 International Civil Aviation Organization (ICAO)
 International Confederation of Free Trade Unions (ICFTU)
 International Criminal Court (ICCt)
 International Criminal Police Organization – INTERPOL
 International Development Association (IDA)
 International Energy Agency (IEA)
 International Federation of Red Cross and Red Crescent Societies (IFRCS)
 International Finance Corporation (IFC)
 International Fund for Agricultural Development (IFAD)
 International Hydrographic Organization (IHO)
 International Labour Organization (ILO)
 International Maritime Organization (IMO)
 International Mobile Satellite Organization (IMSO)
 International Monetary Fund (IMF)
 International Olympic Committee (IOC)
 International Organization for Migration (IOM)
 International Organization for Standardization (ISO)
 International Red Cross and Red Crescent Movement (ICRM)
 International Telecommunication Union (ITU)
 International Telecommunications Satellite Organization (ITSO)
 International Trade Union Confederation (ITUC)
 International Whaling Commission (IWO)

 Inter-Parliamentary Union (IPU)
 Multilateral Investment Guarantee Agency (MIGA)
 Non-Aligned Movement (NAM) (guest)
 North Atlantic Treaty Organization (NATO)
 Nuclear Energy Agency (NEA)
 Nuclear Suppliers Group (NSG)
 Organisation for Economic Co-operation and Development (OECD)
 Organisation for the Prohibition of Chemical Weapons (OPCW)
 Organization for Security and Co-operation in Europe (OSCE)
 Organization of American States (OAS) (observer)
 Pacific Islands Forum (PIF) (partner)
 Paris Club
 Permanent Court of Arbitration (PCA)
 Secretariat of the Pacific Community (SPC)
 Southeast European Cooperative Initiative (SECI) (observer)
 United Nations (UN)
 United Nations Conference on Trade and Development (UNCTAD)
 United Nations Economic and Social Commission for Asia and the Pacific (UNESCAP)
 United Nations Economic Commission for Africa (UNECA) (associate)
 United Nations Economic Commission for Europe (UNECE)
 United Nations Economic Commission for Latin America and the Caribbean (UNECLAC)
 United Nations Educational, Scientific and Cultural Organization (UNESCO)
 United Nations High Commissioner for Refugees (UNHCR)
 United Nations Industrial Development Organization (UNIDO)
 United Nations Interim Administration Mission in Kosovo (UNMIK)
 United Nations Iraq-Kuwait Observation Mission (UNIKOM)
 United Nations Mission in Bosnia and Herzegovina (UNMIBH)
 United Nations Mission in Liberia (UNMIL)
 United Nations Mission in Sierra Leone (UNAMSIL)
 United Nations Mission in the Democratic Republic of Congo (MONUC)
 United Nations Mission in the Sudan (UNMIS)
 United Nations Observer Mission in Georgia (UNOMIG)
 United Nations Peacekeeping Force in Cyprus (UNFICYP)
 United Nations Relief and Works Agency for Palestine Refugees in the Near East (UNRWA)
 United Nations Security Council (UNSC) (permanent member)
 United Nations Transitional Administration in East Timor (UNTAET)
 United Nations University (UNU)
 Universal Postal Union (UPU)
 Western European Union (WEU)
 World Confederation of Labour (WCL)
 World Customs Organization (WCO)
 World Federation of Trade Unions (WFTU)
 World Health Organization (WHO)
 World Intellectual Property Organization (WIPO)
 World Meteorological Organization (WMO)
 World Organization of the Scout Movement
 World Tourism Organization (UNWTO)
 World Trade Organization (WTO)
 World Veterans Federation
 Zangger Committee (ZC)

Local government

 List of local governments in the United Kingdom

Politics of England

Politics of England
 Regional assemblies in England
 Local government in England
 History of local government in England
 Mayors in England

Politics of Northern Ireland

Politics of Northern Ireland
 Northern Ireland Assembly
 First Minister of Northern Ireland, Office vacant
 Deputy First Minister of Northern Ireland, Office vacant
 Local government in Northern Ireland
 History of local government in Northern Ireland
 Mayors in Northern Ireland

Politics of Scotland

Politics of Scotland
 History of Scottish devolution
 Local government in Scotland
 History of local government in Scotland
 Provosts in Scotland
 Pressure Groups in Scotland
 Scottish Parliament
 First Minister of Scotland, Nicola Sturgeon
 Members of the Scottish Parliament
 2007 Scottish Parliament election
 2011 Scottish Parliament election
 2016 Scottish Parliament election
 2021 Scottish Parliament election

Politics of Wales

Politics of Wales
 Local government in Wales
 History of local government in Wales
 Mayors in Wales
 Senedd (Welsh Parliament)
 Members of the Senedd
 Members of the 6th Senedd
 2007 National Assembly for Wales election
 2011 National Assembly for Wales election
 2016 National Assembly for Wales election
 2021 Senedd election
 Welsh Government
 Second Drakeford government
 First Minister of Wales, Mark Drakeford

Honours

New Year Honours
King's Birthday Honours
Prime Minister's Resignation Honours
Chivalric order
Chivalric order#Modern orders
List of honorary British knights and dames
Category:British honours system
Declining a British honour

Military and Defence

British Armed Forces

Command 
 Commander-in-chief: The Sovereign – King Charles III
 Chief of the Defence Staff: Admiral Sir Tony Radakin
 First Sea Lord: Admiral Sir Ben Key
 Chief of the General Staff: General Sir Patrick Sanders
 Chief of the Air Staff: Air Chief Marshal Sir Michael Wigston
 Ministry of Defence (United Kingdom)
 Defence Council of the United Kingdom

Forces
 British Armed Forces
 British Army
 Royal Navy
 Royal Marines
 Royal Air Force

History
See

Related topics
 United Kingdom and weapons of mass destruction
 Nuclear weapons and the United Kingdom

Law and order

Law of the United Kingdom

 9-9-9 emergency telephone number
 British citizenship, British nationality law
 Cannabis in the United Kingdom
 Capital punishment in the United Kingdom
 Common law
 Constitution of the United Kingdom
 History of the Constitution of the United Kingdom
 Magna Carta (1215)
 Petition of Right (1628)
 Habeas Corpus Act (1679)
 Bill of Rights (1689)
 Great Reform Act (1832)
 Parliament Act (1911)
 Scotland Act 1998
 Northern Ireland Act 1998
 Government of Wales Act 1998
 House of Lords Act 1999
 Courts of the United Kingdom
 Crime in the United Kingdom
 Law of the European Union
 Human rights in the United Kingdom
 Civil liberties in the United Kingdom
 LGBT rights in the United Kingdom
 Freedom of religion in the United Kingdom
 High treason in the United Kingdom
 Law enforcement in the United Kingdom
 Diplomatic Protection Group
 National Crime Agency
 Special Branch
 List of prisons in the United Kingdom
 United Kingdom prison population

Law of England and Wales

 Courts of England and Wales
 Crown Prosecution Service
 His Majesty's Prison Service
 Multi-Agency Public Protection Arrangements
 National Offender Management Service
 National Probation Service
 Police Federation of England and Wales
 Prison population of England and Wales
 Serious Fraud Office

Law of Northern Ireland

Northern Ireland law
 Independent Commission on Policing for Northern Ireland

Law of Scotland

Scots law

 Courts of Scotland
 Crown Office and Procurator Fiscal Service
 Faculty of Advocates
 Scottish Police Federation
 Scottish Prison Service
 Scottish Crime and Drug Enforcement Agency

Infrastructure

 Water supply and sanitation in the United Kingdom

Regulatory bodies
 Advertising Standards Authority
 Financial Services Authority or FSA
 Housing Corporation
 Office of Communications (Ofcom)
 Office of the Water Regulator (Ofwat)
 Press Complaints Commission
 Office of the Immigration Services Commissioner (OISC)

Trade Union Federations
 Irish Congress of Trades Unions
 Trades Union Congress
 Scottish Trades Union Congress

Transport

Transport in the United Kingdom
 British Rail
 Airports in the United Kingdom
 Bus transport in the United Kingdom
 Coach transport in the United Kingdom
 List of long-distance footpaths in the United Kingdom
 Railway system
 History of rail transport
 List of railway viaducts in the United Kingdom
 Stations A-Z
 London Underground
 Trams and Light Rail Trams and light rail systems
 Roads in the United Kingdom
 British car number plates
 Great Britain road numbering scheme
 List of car manufacturers of the United Kingdom
 List of motorways in the United Kingdom
 Motoring taxation in the United Kingdom
 Waterways in the United Kingdom
 British Waterways
 Waterways Ireland
 History of the British canal system
 Tunnels in the United Kingdom
 Cycleways in the United Kingdom
 Common Travel Area
 Transport Scotland

Economy

Economy of the United Kingdom

 Economic rank, by nominal GDP (2008): 6th (sixth)
 Economic history of the United Kingdom
 The Industrial Revolution
 The Great Depression in the United Kingdom
 Financial services industry of the United Kingdom
 Banking in the United Kingdom
 Banks of the United Kingdom
 Bank of England
 Bank of Scotland
 Royal Bank of Scotland
 London Stock Exchange
 FTSE 100 Index
 Private finance initiative
 Currency of the United Kingdom: pound sterling
 ISO 4217: GBP
 British coinage
 British banknotes
 Pound sterling
 Communications in the United Kingdom
 Internet in the United Kingdom
 Companies of the United Kingdom
 Manufacturing in the United Kingdom
 Automotive industry in the United Kingdom
 Aerospace industry in the United Kingdom
 Pharmaceutical industry in the United Kingdom
 Construction industry of the United Kingdom
 Mining in the United Kingdom
 North Sea oil
 Energy in the United Kingdom
 Energy use and conservation in the United Kingdom
 Energy policy of the United Kingdom
 Energy policy of Scotland
 Legal services in the United Kingdom
 Real estate in the United Kingdom
 Tourism in the United Kingdom
 Tourism in England
 Tourism in Scotland
 Tourism in Wales
 Tourism in Northern Ireland
 Transport in the United Kingdom
 Economy of London
 City of London

History

 History of the United Kingdom
 Timeline of British history
 History of England
 Social history of England
 Timeline of English history
 History of Scotland
 Timeline of Scottish history
 History of Wales
 History of Northern Ireland
Plantation of Ulster
 History of the formation of the United Kingdom
 Treaty of Union
 Acts of Union 1707
 Act of Union 1800
 British Empire and the Commonwealth
 UK underground

History by period 
 Georgian era
 Victorian era
 Edwardian era
 First World War
 Interwar
 Second World War
civilian
military
 Postwar 
political
social
 Since 1979
political 
social

Historical states of the British Isles

 Ancient Britain
 Avalon
 Roman Britain
 Caledonia
 Hibernia
 Kingdom of the Picts
 Kingdom of the Scots
 Heptarchy
 States in Medieval Britain
 Commonwealth of England
 Kingdom of England
 Kingdom of Ireland
 Kingdom of Scotland (when Picts and Scots merged in 843)
 Kingdom of Great Britain (when England & Scotland merged in 1707);
 United Kingdom of Great Britain and Ireland (when Great Britain and Ireland merged in 1801)

By subject

 Economic history of the United Kingdom
 Economic history of Scotland
 Maritime history of the United Kingdom
 Maritime history of England
 Maritime history of Scotland
 Military history of the United Kingdom
 Military history of the United Kingdom during World War II
 Bletchley Park
 History of agriculture in Scotland
 History of Bangladeshis in the United Kingdom
 History of Christianity in Scotland
 History of company law in the United Kingdom
 History of education in England
 History of education in Scotland
 History of electroconvulsive therapy in the United Kingdom
 History of fire brigades in the United Kingdom
 History of fire safety legislation in the United Kingdom
 History of football in England
 History of football in Scotland
 History of labour law in the United Kingdom
 History of law enforcement in the United Kingdom
 History of lidos in the United Kingdom
 History of local government in the United Kingdom
 History of local government in England
 History of local government in Scotland
 History of local government in Wales
 History of medical regulation in the United Kingdom
 History of Megabus routes in the United Kingdom
 History of metrication in the United Kingdom
 History of psychosurgery in the United Kingdom
 History of rail transport in the United Kingdom
 History of rugby union in Scotland
 History of taxation in the United Kingdom
 History of the Church of England
 History of the Constitution of the United Kingdom
 History of the formation of the United Kingdom
 History of the Green Party of England and Wales
 History of the Jews in the United Kingdom
 History of the Jews in England
 History of the Jews in England (1066–1290)
 History of the Jews in Northern Ireland
 History of the Jews in Scotland
 History of the Jews in Wales
 History of the Marranos in England
 History of rail transport in Great Britain
 History of rail transport in Ireland
 History of the Reformation in Scotland
 History of the socialist movement in the United Kingdom
 History of the trust movement in Scotland
 History of trial by jury in England
 History of violence against LGBT people in the United Kingdom

Culture

Culture of the United Kingdom

 British cuisine
 English cuisine
 Northern Irish cuisine
 Irish cuisine
 Scottish cuisine
 Welsh cuisine
 Festivals in the United Kingdom
 Gambling in the United Kingdom
 British humour
 Marriage in the United Kingdom
 Marriage in England and Wales
 Marriage in Northern Ireland
 Marriage in Scotland
 Civil partnership in the United Kingdom
 Media of the United Kingdom
 Symbols of the United Kingdom, the Channel Islands and the Isle of Man
 Coat of arms of the United Kingdom
 Flag of the United Kingdom
 Union Jack
 National anthem of the United Kingdom
 Prostitution in the United Kingdom
 Public holidays in the United Kingdom
 Religion in the United Kingdom
 Buddhism in the United Kingdom
 Christianity in the United Kingdom
 Hinduism in the United Kingdom
 Islam in the United Kingdom
 Judaism in the United Kingdom
 Sikhism in the United Kingdom
 World Heritage Sites in the United Kingdom

Architecture

Architecture of the United Kingdom

 List of cathedrals in England and Wales
 Council houses
 Energy efficiency in British housing
 Housing associations
 List of bridges in the United Kingdom
 National House Building Council
 New towns
 Piers (England and Wales)
 Reservoirs and dams in the United Kingdom
 Town and Country Planning in the United Kingdom

Architecture of England
 Abbeys and priories in England
 Crossing the Thames, including tunnels
 Historic houses in England
 Housing Corporation

Architecture of Scotland
 Abbeys and priories in Scotland

Architecture of Wales
 Abbeys and priories in Wales

Architecture of Northern Ireland
 Abbeys and priories in Northern Ireland

Gardens
 List of botanical gardens in the United Kingdom
 Gardens in England
 Gardens in Scotland
 Gardens in Wales
 Gardens in Northern Ireland

The arts

 Art of the United Kingdom
 Crown Jewels of the United Kingdom
 Pornography in the United Kingdom
 British comedy
 Cinema of the United Kingdom
 Literature of the United Kingdom
 List of English writers
 Music of the United Kingdom
 Television in the United Kingdom
 Theatre of the United Kingdom
 List of British playwrights
 List of theatres in the United Kingdom

Museums

 Museums in England
 Museums in Northern Ireland
 Museums in Scotland
 Museums in Wales
 List of British railway museums

Music

 Music of the United Kingdom
 List of music festivals in the United Kingdom

Popular music

 British pop music
 British popular music
 Early British popular music
 British Invasion
 New wave of British heavy metal
 Britpop
 List of one-hit wonders on the UK Singles Chart
 United Kingdom in the Eurovision Song Contest
 Music Hall

Classical music

 BBC Symphony Orchestra
 BBC National Orchestra of Wales
 BBC Scottish Symphony Orchestra
 BBC Philharmonic Orchestra
 City of Birmingham Symphony Orchestra (CBSO)
 Hallé Orchestra
 Royal Liverpool Philharmonic Orchestra
 Royal Philharmonic Orchestra
 Royal Scottish National Orchestra
 Philharmonia
 London Symphony Orchestra
 London Philharmonic Orchestra
 Bournemouth Symphony Orchestra
 Scottish Chamber Orchestra
 The Proms
 British opera
 Ulster Orchestra

Folk music

 Music of England
 Music of Northern Ireland
 Music of Scotland
 Music of Wales

Theatre

 Royal Academy of Dramatic Art
 Royal National Theatre
 Laurence Olivier Awards
 Theatres in England
 Theatres in Northern Ireland
 Theatres in Scotland
 Theatres in Wales

Film

Cinema of the United Kingdom

 British Film Institute
 BFI Top 100 British films
 National Film and Television Archive
 British Academy of Film and Television Arts (BAFTA)
 British Independent Film Awards
 Carry On films

Cultural icons

United Kingdom icons

 AEC Routemaster red double-decker bus
 Baked beans
 Basil Fawlty
 The Beano
 The Beatles
 Big Ben chimes
 Black Cab (hackney cab)
 Boudica
 Bowler hat
 Britannia
 British Monarchy
 Britpop
 British Rail
 British Bulldog
 Cap of Maintenance
 A Clockwork Orange
 Cool Britannia
 Concorde
 Coronation Street
 Crossroads
 Crown Jewels of the United Kingdom
 Cutty Sark
 Dad's Army
 Doctor Who
 Dig for Victory
 EastEnders
 England expects that every man will do his duty
 Excalibur
 Excalibur (comics)
 Fawlty Towers
 The Few, "..so much owed by so many to so few"
 Fish and chips
 Football (soccer)
 Frank Spencer
 Full breakfast: Full English, Ulster fry, Scottish, Welsh
 Gentleman's Relish
 God Save the Queen
 The Great Escape
 Hackney carriage
 Harry Potter
 HP sauce
 Hyacinth Bucket
 The Italian Job
 Jaffa Cakes
 James Bond
 John Bull
 King Arthur
 Land of Hope and Glory
 Land Rover Defender
 Last Night of the Proms
 The Lion and the Unicorn
 Lonsdale Belt
 The Lord of the Rings
 Marks & Spencer
 Marmite
 Mini
 Miniskirt
 Miss Marple
 Mod
 Monty Python
 Morrissey
 Page Three girl
 Pantomime
 Pint glass
 Police box
 Pub
 Punk
 King's Guard
 
 Red Arrows
 Red post boxes
 Red telephone boxes
 Robin
 Rolls-Royce Motor Cars
 Royal Warrant
 Rule Britannia
 Rugby
 The Sex Pistols
 Sherlock Holmes
 Skinhead
 Special Air Service (SAS)
 Sten
 Suffragettes
 Supermarine Spitfire
 Swinging Sixties
 Tea (cup of)
 Tea (meal)
 Test Card F
 Thunderbirds
 Tommy Atkins (generic name for a British soldier)
 Brodie helmet (helmet worn by the above)
 Trooping the Colour
 Twiglets
 Umbrella
 Union Flag
 Weather
 We shall never surrender, ..fight them on the beaches speech
 Wallace and Gromit
 Wellington boot
 Winston Churchill
 Woolworths Group plc

English icons

 1966 World cup squad
 And did those feet in ancient time
 Angel of the North
 Bangers and mash
 The Boat Race
 Clapham Junction
 Cricket
 Del Boy
 Dixon of Dock Green
 EastEnders
 English rose
 Full English breakfast
 Jack the Ripper
 King Arthur
 London Bridge
 London Eye
 M25 motorway
 Morris dance
 Only Fools and Horses
 Oxbridge
 Premier League
 Robin Hood
 Saint George's Cross
 Soho
 Spaghetti Junction
 Status Quo
 Stilton cheese
 Stonehenge
 There'll Always Be an England
 Three Lions
 Tower Bridge
 Tube map
 Tudor rose
 Yeoman
 Yeomen Warders
 White Cliffs of Dover

Northern Irish icons

 Carrickfergus Castle
 Free Derry
 George Best
 Giant's Causeway
 Glens of Antrim
 H-Blocks
 Harland and Wolff
 Hurling, administered by Ulster GAA
 Mourne Mountains
 Saint Patrick's Day

Scottish icons

 Alex Ferguson
 Auld Lang Syne
 Bagpipes
 Ben Nevis
 Billy Connolly
 Dundee cake
 Edinburgh Castle
 Eilean Donan Castle
 Flower of Scotland
 Forth Bridge
 Full Scottish breakfast
 Great Highland bagpipe
 Hackle
 Haggis (with neeps and tatties)
 Highland games
 Kilt
 Loch Lomond
 Loch Ness
 Old Firm
 Oatcake
 Porridge
 Robert the Bruce
 Robert Burns
 St Andrew's Cross
 Scotch whisky
 Scotland the Brave
 Scottish Premier League
 Scots Wha Hae
 Sgian-dubh
 Shinty
 Shortbread
 Stirling Castle
 Tam o' shanter
 Tartan
 Thistle
 Trews
 Tweed (cloth)
 Unicorn
 Up Helly Aa

Welsh icons

 Bryn Terfel
 Cymraeg (Welsh language)
 Daffodil
 Eisteddfod inc. National Eisteddfod of Wales
 Land of my Fathers
 Laver bread
 Leek
 Rhondda Valley
 Rugby union in Wales
 Tom Jones (singer)
 Welsh Dragon
 Welsh rarebit
 Welsh hat

Languages

Languages of the United Kingdom

 English Language
 English dialects
 British English
 Regional accents of English speakers
 English language in England
 Scottish English
 Welsh English
 Ulster English
 Hiberno-English
 Comparison of American and British English
 Oxford English Dictionary
 Celtic languages
 Welsh
 Scots Gaelic
 Irish language in Northern Ireland
 Ulster Irish
 Cornish
 Manx
 Scots in Scotland and Ulster
 British Sign Language (BSL)
 Romany
 Indian, Pakistani and Bangladeshi languages
 Gujarati
 Telugu
 Tamil
 Hindi
 Punjabi
 Urdu
 Bengali

People

Demography of the United Kingdom

 British people
 Lists of Britons
 English people
 List of English people
 People of Northern Ireland
 Scottish people
 List of Scots
 Welsh people
 List of Welsh people
 Cornish people
 List of Cornish people
 List of people commemorated by blue plaques

Interest groups and societies

 British Professional Bodies
 Women's Institute
 List of UK learned societies
 List of London's gentlemen's clubs
 Pressure groups in the United Kingdom
 Fathers' rights movement in the UK

Religion

Religion in the United Kingdom

 Religion in England
 Religion in Northern Ireland
 Religion in Scotland
 Religion in Wales

 Christianity
 Assemblies of God in Great Britain
 Church of England (the established church in England)
 Church of Scotland (the national church of Scotland)
 Church of Ireland
 Church in Wales
 Episcopal Church of Scotland
 Free Church of Scotland (post 1900)
 Free Church of Scotland (Continuing)
 Free Presbyterian Church of Ulster
 Reformed Presbyterian Church of Ireland
 Reformed Presbyterian Church of Scotland
 Presbyterian Church of Ireland
 Presbyterian Church of Wales
 General Assembly of Unitarian and Free Christian Churches
 Methodism
 Open Brethren
 Non-subscribing Presbyterian Church of Ireland
 Roman Catholic Church in England and Wales
 Roman Catholic Church in Scotland
 Coptic Orthodox Church in Britain and Ireland
 United Reformed Church
 Religious Society of Friends (Quakers)
 The Church of Jesus Christ of Latter-day Saints
 Hinduism in the United Kingdom
 Hinduism in England
 Hinduism in Northern Ireland
 Hinduism in Scotland
 Hinduism in Wales
 Islam in the United Kingdom
 Islam in England
 Islam in Northern Ireland
 Islam in Scotland
 Islam in Wales
 Judaism
 History of the Jews in England
 History of the Jews in Scotland
 Sikhism in the United Kingdom
 Sikhism in England
 Sikhism in Scotland
 Buddhism in the United Kingdom
 Buddhism in England
 Buddhism in Scotland
 Druidism
 Other
 Atheism/ Irreligion
 Jedi
 Scientology in the United Kingdom
 Status of religious freedom in the United Kingdom

Sports, games, and pastimes

Sport in the United Kingdom
The following are the major sports; local groups may well play many others.

Angling
 National Federation of Anglers
 National Federation of Sea Anglers
 Salmon and Trout Association

Chess
 English Chess Federation
 Scottish Chess Championship

Cricket

 Cricket in England
 2005 English cricket season
 England cricket team
 Marylebone Cricket Club
 County cricket
 Cricket in Scotland
 Scotland national cricket team
 Cricket in Wales
 England cricket team
 Wales national cricket team
 Cricket in Ireland
 Ireland cricket team

Hiking
 Long-distance footpaths in the UK
 Ramblers' Association

Association football

 British Home Championship

 England
 The Football Association
 England national football team
 FA Premier League
 The Football League
 FA Cup
 English football league system
 National League System
 Scotland
 Scottish Football Association
 Scotland national football team
 List of Scottish Football Clubs
 Scottish Football League
 Scottish Premier League
 Highland Football League
 East of Scotland Football League
 South of Scotland Football League
 Scottish Junior Football Association
 North Caledonian Football League
 Scottish Cup
 Northern Ireland
 Irish Football Association (not to be confused with the Football Association of Ireland)
 Northern Ireland national football team
 Irish Football League (not to be confused with the League of Ireland)
 Wales
 Football Association of Wales
 Wales National Football Team
 League of Wales

Polo
 Hurlingham Polo Association

Rugby

 Rugby union
 England
 Rugby Football Union
 England national rugby union team
 Guinness Premiership
 National Division One
 Wales
 Welsh Rugby Union
 Wales national rugby union team
 Pro14
 Welsh Premier Division
 Scotland
 Scottish Rugby Union
 Scotland national rugby union team
 Pro14
 Northern Ireland
 Irish Rugby Football Union
 Ireland national rugby union team
 Pro14
 Calcutta Cup
 Powergen Cup
 British and Irish Lions
 Rugby league
 England
 Rugby Football League
 Northern Ireland
 Rugby League Ireland
 Scotland
 Scotland Rugby League
 Wales
 Great Britain
 Challenge Cup

Sport rowing
 Boat Race (Oxford vs Cambridge)
 Henley Royal Regatta

Skiing
 Ski Club of Great Britain

Other sports, games, and pastimes

 London Olympics
 Bowls
 Curling
 Darts
 English billiards
 Eton Wall Game
 Fives (including Eton Fives)
 British Gliding Association
 Horse racing in Great Britain
 Lawn tennis
 Shinty
 Skittles
 Snooker
 Motorsport

Education
 Education in the United Kingdom
 Schools in the United Kingdom
 Preparatory school
 Grammar schools in the United Kingdom
 Private schools in the United Kingdom
 List of schools in the United Kingdom
 School years
 Universities in the United Kingdom
 British undergraduate degree classification
 List of universities in the United Kingdom
 National Union of Students of the United Kingdom

Education in England
 Education in England
 Academy (England)
 General Teaching Council for England
 List of schools in England
 List of universities in England
 National Curriculum for England

Education in Northern Ireland
 Education in Northern Ireland
 List of schools in Northern Ireland
 Northern Ireland Curriculum

Education in Scotland
 Education in Scotland
 Curriculum for Excellence
 Educational Institute of Scotland
 General Teaching Council for Scotland
 Her Majesty's Inspectorate of Education
 List of schools in Scotland
 List of private schools in Scotland
 List of universities in Scotland
 Students' representative council
 Scottish Secondary Teachers' Association
 Scottish Qualifications Authority

Education in Wales
 Education in Wales
 List of schools in Wales
 National Curriculum for Wales

See also

 List of international rankings
 Member states of the Commonwealth of Nations
 Member states of the North Atlantic Treaty Organization
 Member states of the United Nations
 Outline of Europe
 Outline of geography

References

External links

 
 
  of the British Monarchy
  of the United Kingdom Government
  of the national tourism agency (VisitBritain)

United Kingdom
 1